Xandrames dholaria is a moth of the family Geometridae first described by Frederic Moore in 1868. It is found in China, Japan and Taiwan.

References

Moths described in 1868
Boarmiini
Moths of Japan